José Vicente may refer to:

Politicians
José Vicente Reynafé (1782–1837), Argentine politician
José Vicente Cuadra (1812–1894), Nicaraguan former president
José Vicente Concha (1867–1929), Colombian former president
José Vicente de Freitas (1869–1952), Portuguese politician
José Vicente Faria Lima (1909–1969), Brazilian politician
José Vicente Rangel (born 1929), Venezuelan politician
José Vicente Beviá Pastor (1933–2012), Spanish politician
José Vicente Rangel Ávalos (born 1956), Venezuelan politician

Sportspeople
José Vicente Salinas (1904–1975), Chilean sprinter
José Vicente (pole vaulter) (1922–2022), Puerto Rican pole vaulter
José Vicente Grecco (1929–2008), Argentine footballer
José Vicente (footballer) (born 1931), Spanish footballer
José Vicente de Moura (born 1937), Portuguese Olympic Committee president
José Vicente León (born 1943), Spanish swimmer
José Vicente Sánchez (born 1956), Spanish footballer
José Vicente Lledó (born 1971), Spanish footballer
José Vicente García (born 1972), Spanish cyclist
José Vicente Toribio (born 1985), Spanish cyclist

Others
José Vicente Feliz (1741–1822), Spanish explorer
José Vicente Barbosa du Bocage (1823–1907), Portuguese zoologist
José Vicente Matias (born 1966), Brazilian serial killer